Peter Kessler Eriksson (born July 12, 1965 in Kramfors, Sweden) is a retired Swedish professional ice hockey left winger.

He played for HV71 Jönköping in the Swedish elite league Elitserien from 1985–1989 before joining the Edmonton Oilers of the National Hockey League for the 1989–90 season.  He played 20 games for the NHL club, scoring 3 goals and 3 assists.  He also spent part of the season playing for the Oilers' minor league affiliate, the Cape Breton Oilers.  He returned to Sweden at the end of the season, and played four more years with HV71.

Eriksson played for the Swedish national team several times in his career, including the 1987 Canada Cup, the 1988 Winter Olympics, where he was part of the bronze medal winning team, and the 1989 World Ice Hockey Championships.

Career statistics

Regular season and playoffs

International

References

1965 births
Living people
Swedish ice hockey left wingers
Swedish expatriate ice hockey players in Canada
Edmonton Oilers draft picks
Edmonton Oilers players
Cape Breton Oilers players
HV71 players
Olympic bronze medalists for Sweden
Olympic ice hockey players of Sweden
Ice hockey players at the 1988 Winter Olympics
Olympic medalists in ice hockey
Medalists at the 1988 Winter Olympics
People from Kramfors Municipality
Sportspeople from Västernorrland County
Swedish expatriate ice hockey players in Germany